Kudo Be'ur is a town in Eritrea.  It is located in the Debub (Southern) region and is the capital of the Kudo Be'ur district.

References
Statoids.com, retrieved December 8, 2010

Populated places in Eritrea
Southern Region (Eritrea)